"Familiar Realm" is a song by American rock band CKY, featured on their 2005 third studio album An Answer Can Be Found. Written by vocalist and guitarist Deron Miller and guitarist Chad I Ginsburg, who also produced the album, the song was released as the only single from the album on May 25, 2005.

Background
Deron Miller, while recognising that it was "the song that sold the record", suggests that "Familiar Realm" was "the wrong choice" for the lead single from An Answer..., instead favouring "The Way You Lived" and, as a second single, "Don't Hold Your Breath". Drummer Jess Margera has revealed that the song is his least favourite to perform live, suggesting that "it just doesn't come across live anywhere near as smoothly as the record."

Music video
The music video for "Familiar Realm", the only to be produced for a track from An Answer Can Be Found, was directed by Matt Lenski, the first not to involve Bam Margera. Deron Miller described the music video as "a pretty sick vid".

Track listing

References

2005 singles
CKY (band) songs
Music videos directed by Matt Lenski
Songs written by Deron Miller
Songs written by Chad I Ginsburg
2005 songs